Hidden Colors is a series of documentary films directed by Tariq Nasheed and produced by King Flex Entertainment, to explain what Nasheed claims is the marginalizing of people of African descent in America and across the world.

Series

The first film in the series, Hidden Colors: The Untold History of People of Aboriginal, Moor, and African Descent, was given a limited theatrical release on April 14, 2011.
The second in the series, Hidden Colors 2: The Triumph of Melanin, was released the following year on December 6, 2012.  The third film in the series, Hidden Colors 3: The Rules of Racism, was released on June 26, 2014.  The fourth film in the series, Hidden Colors 4: The Religion of White Supremacy was successfully funded on Kickstarter in March 2015. The fifth film in the series, Hidden Colors 5: The Art of Black Warfare, was released in August 2019.

Hidden Colors: The Untold History of People of Aboriginal, Moor, and African Descent
The first installment in the series was released on April 14, 2011. The film discusses the role of African and aboriginal people in history and argues some achievements have not been properly recorded or credited to them. Hidden Colors features several interviews with commentators on subjects such as the race and appearance of Jesus Christ and the reasons behind the end of slavery. The film also states Africans were the first to circumnavigate the globe, there was "pre-European settlement in the United States", that Africans created the first Asian dynasties, and that the Vatican created Egyptology.

Cast

 Tariq Nasheed
 Phil Valentine
 Frances Cress Welsing
 Shahrazad Ali
 Sabir Bey
 Booker T. Coleman
 Umar Johnson

Hidden Colors 2: The Triumph of Melanin
The second installment was released on December 6, 2012 and was also directed by Nasheed. The documentary further explores issues surrounding people of African and aboriginal descent such as the global African presence and the treatment of Black economic communities in America. Other film topics include the investigation of melanin.

Cast

 Michelle Alexander
 KRS-One
 Tariq Nasheed
 Runoko Rashidi
 Phil Valentine (Not the talk show host)
 James Small
 Claud Anderson
 Tony Browder
 Booker T. Coleman
 Umar Johnson

Hidden Colors 3: The Rules of Racism
The third installment was released on June 26, 2014. The film focuses on the topic of race, racism, and history within the United States.

Cast

 Shahrazad Ali
 Carol Anderson
 David Banner
 Dick Gregory
 Paul Mooney
 Khalil Gibran Muhammad
 Nas
 Tariq Nasheed
 Killer Mike
 Phil Valentine 
 Frances Cress Welsing
 George Fraser
 Joy Degruy
 Umar Johnson
 Kaba Kamene

Hidden Colors 4: The Religion of White Supremacy

 Tariq Nasheed
Jennifer Tosch
Tony Browder
Llaila Afrika
Boyce Watkins
Robin Walker
Phil Valentine
James Small
Eric Sheppard
Patricia Newton
Nteri Nelson
Killer Mike
Kaba Kamene
Jim Brown
Delbert Blair

Hidden Colors 5: The Art of Black Warfare

 Tariq Nasheed
 Claud Anderson
 Brother Polight
 Kaba Kamene
 Shahrazad Ali
 Ice-T
 Chuck D
 David Banner
 Rizza Islam
 Charm Tims
 Michael Jai White
 Jabari Osaze
 Kmt Shockley
 James Small

Reception
The radio program Powertalk hosted by Lorraine Jacques-White called Hidden Colors "eye-opening and necessary."

A review of Hidden Colors 2 published in The Village Voice dismissed much of the documentary as conspiracy, saying that Nasheed demonstrates "a seeming total inability to separate gibble-gabble from revealed truth, vital social concern from talk about Chemtrails and digressive subchapters with titles like 'The Hidden Truth About Santa Claus.'" The reviewer praised one contributor, Michelle Alexander, who the Voice noted was the only woman in the film, saying that "Her well-reasoned discussion of the American penal system is compelling, but it's an embarrassment that she should be placed alongside the likes of Phil Valentine, a metaphysician whose malarkey about AIDS ("the so-called immunity system of the homosexual") is a low point, as is Umar Johnson's lionization of the late, unlamented Gaddafi and the odd nostalgia for segregation that runs throughout."

BET described the series as "one of the most successful Black independent documentaries."

The Root called the series "semi-factual."

References

External links
 
 
 
 
 
 

Documentary film series
American documentary films
2010s English-language films
2011 documentary films
2011 films
Documentary films about race and ethnicity
Film series introduced in 2011
2012 documentary films
2012 films
2014 documentary films
2016 documentary films
2019 documentary films
2010s American films